Stadsparksvallen, locally sometimes called Vallen, is a classic sports facility located in Jönköping, Sweden.

Stadsparksvallen was inaugurated in 1902 and is located in the Jönköping City Park, atop a mountain located west of the city. It functions as home ground for soccer club Jönköpings Södra IF IK Tord has also played its home games here during som seasons. Until 1981 it was also used for track and field events. Jönköpings Södra IF has played 10 seasons in the Swedish Allsvenskan in Stadsparksvallen. Sweden women's national football team has played thrice at the venue, first time in 1985 against Belgium.

During the Swedish Sports Confederation's 100th anniversary in 2003, Stadsparksvallen was designated as one of the 100 sports historic places in Sweden.

Facts
 Dimensions: 115 x 71 yards (105 x 65 meters)
 Capacity: 7,300, of which 3,739 are seated under roof
 Record attendance: 18,582, Jönköpings Södra IF vs. Malmö FF, final match during season 1949–50 in Allsvenskan

References

External links

Football venues in Sweden
Jönköpings Södra IF
Sports venues in Jönköping
Sports venues completed in 1902
1902 establishments in Sweden